St Columb may refer to:
 Columba or St Columb of Scotland
 St Columb's Cathedral, Derry, Northern Ireland
 St Columb's College, Derry, Northern Ireland
 Columba the Virgin or Saint Columba the Virgin or St Columb of Cornwall
 St Columb Canal, in Cornwall, England
 St Columb Major, town in Cornwall, England
 St Columb Minor, village in Cornwall, England
 St Columb Road, village in Cornwall, England
 St Columb Porth, Cornwall, seaside village in Cornwall
 Lady Dona St Columb, a character in Frenchman's Creek by Daphne du Maurier
 The Monastery of St Columb, a book by Regina Maria Roche

See also
 Saint Columba (disambiguation)
 Santa Coloma (disambiguation)